Uniq (Hangul: 유니크; stylized UNIQ) is a five-member South Korean–Chinese boy band formed by Chinese company Yuehua Entertainment in 2014. The group consists of Zhou Yixuan, Kim Sung-joo, Li Wenhan, Cho Seung-youn, and Wang Yibo. Uniq officially debuted on October 20, 2014 with their debut single "Falling In Love" in both China and South Korea.

History

Pre-debut
Uniq was initially planned as a YG Entertainment boy group, with the five members spending between two to five years at YG as trainees. Uniq was to be a collaborative effort with the Chinese company Yuehua Entertainment. Ultimately, the group debuted solely under Yuehua.

2014: Debut with Falling in Love
On October 16, 2014, Uniq had their first broadcast performance in South Korea, on M Countdown. Their debut single, "Falling In Love", was released on October 20 in both China and South Korea. The group released the English adaptation of "Falling in Love" on November 5. Uniq had their first Chinese event, their fanmeet in Beijing on November 25. On November 27, Uniq began promotions in Taiwan and held a press conference on December 1. Uniq's three episode reality show The Best Debut began airing on December 2 on the Chinese online video platform, iQiyi.

Early in their debut, Uniq was chosen to participate in the OST for the movies TMNT and Penguins of Madagascar. On October 23, they released the song "Born to Fight" for the Chinese release of TNMT.  On November 10, they released "Celebrate" for the Chinese release of Penguins of Madagascar.

2015: EOEO and Japanese Debut 
In January 2015, Uniq became endorsers for Xtep, a Chinese athletic brand. In February 2015, Uniq began promoting a Chinese beauty shop, Mix-Box, replacing Ko Chen-tung as the official endorser.

Uniq held their first fanmeet in Thailand in Bangkok on March 7.

In April, Yuehua Entertainment announced Uniq's comeback with their first mini album titled "EOEO". On April 22 they held their first comeback broadcast performance on MBC's Show Champion, performing their title track "EOEO" and "Listen to Me". On April 23, Uniq made their official comeback in China, performing "Listen to Me" at the KU Music Asian Music Awards. They were also awarded with KU Music Asian Music Awards' "Best New Artist" the same day. On April 24, Uniq released their mini album and the official music video for "EOEO". After the release of "EOEO", the music video reached number 3 on the YinYueTai Weekly MV Chart.

On May 22, Uniq released the official music video for their follow up track "Luv Again". Uniq achieved their first music show award on CCTV's Global Chinese Music chart on May 23.  Uniq broke the record for most wins on Global Chinese Music Chart with three wins by non-live voting and three wins by live voting, beating the record previously held by EXO-M in 2014.

Uniq held their first showcases in Japan on July 19 and July 20 in Osaka and Tokyo respectively marking their debut in Japan.

In December, Uniq began to endorse Dr. Bear, a Chinese candy brand.

To commemorate their one year since debut, Uniq released their second digital album, "Best Friend", on October 16. Uniq announced their 1st Anniversary Tour to be held in Beijing, Shanghai, and Japan. Uniq returned to Japan in November holding fanmeets across the country in Nagoya, Osaka, Fukuoka before ending the Japan tour in Tokyo. At this time, they released a special Japanese single album, "Best Friend," which includes the Japanese, Korean and Instrumental versions of "Best Friend." UNIQ concluded the tour in Beijing on November 28. The Shanghai stop was postponed, however a new date was never announced.

On December 7, Uniq released "Erase Your Little Sadness."  On December 28, Uniq released "Happy New Year", with labelmate, Cosmic Girls, making a guest appearance in the music video. The song debuted at #4 position in China V Chart.

2016: China and Japan Promotion 
Uniq began Inke endorsements in February 2016, a Chinese live-streaming app. In March 24, the group released the song "My Dream" for the soundtrack of the movie MBA Partners, debuting at #3 position in China V Chart. Yixuan, Wenhan and Sungjoo went on a two-week-long roadshow in 14 cities to promote the movie.

On June 25, Uniq held their first fanmeet in Sao Paulo, Brazil.

Uniq released a Japanese single album in December 2016, "Falling in Love". Japanese versions of "Falling in Love" and "Listen to Me" are included in the single. Uniq held a Live Meet and Greet in Japan on December 10, and a fan signing and photo event on December 11.

2017–present
On January 19, 2017, the group released the single "Happy New Year 2017". The song was written by Zhou Yixuan and brings the freshness of the year that begins. Yibo was unable to participate in the music video and the recording of the song due to scheduling conflicts. In the MV, Yixuan, Sungjoo, Wenhan, and Seungyoun assembled a snowman that represents Yibo.

Uniq had two singles "Never Left" and "Next Mistake" released on April 19, 2018.

The group has been on indefinite hiatus since 2018, although they have not officially disbanded, while the members have pursued independent projects. Yibo has pursued acting projects, while Wenhan debuted in the group UNINE, Yixuan debuted in the group New Storm and Seungyoun in X1. Sungjoo enlisted for his military service.

On October 16, 2020, for their 6th anniversary of debuting, Yixuan released the song "Remember That Day When We" dedicated to the Uniq members and the fans.

Members
 Zhou Yixuan
 Kim Sung-joo (Hangul:김성주, RR : Kim Seong-joo) 
 Li Wenhan
 Cho Seung-youn (Hangul: 조승연, RR : Jo Seung-yeon)
 Wang Yibo

Discography

Extended plays

Singles

Soundtracks

Other charted songs

Production credits

Music videos

Awards

Notes

References

Musical groups from Seoul
Chinese K-pop singers
South Korean boy bands
Chinese boy bands
Mandopop musical groups
K-pop music groups
South Korean pop music groups
Chinese pop music groups
South Korean dance music groups
Chinese dance music groups
Mandarin-language singers of South Korea
Japanese-language singers of South Korea
English-language singers from South Korea
English-language singers from China
Musical groups established in 2014
2014 establishments in South Korea
2014 establishments in China
Musical quintets
Yuehua Entertainment artists